Pengerang (Jawi: ڤڠرڠ) is a municipality in Kota Tinggi District, in the Malaysian state of Johor. It was established in 2017. It is home to the Pengerang Integrated Petroleum Complex (PIPC), a major hub for the oil and gas industry in the state.

History 
Pengerang as a place name was first mentioned in Hikayat Abdullah, a 19th-century traditional Malay literature.

Pengerang was initially a cluster of villages on the southeastern coast of Johor. In 1957, Pengerang was upgraded to a subdistrict under Kota Tinggi District.

Administration 

Pengerang was established as a local authority (PBT) on 16 January 2017; it was the 16th local authority established in Johor. It was initially named Pengerang Local Authority and under the management of Johor Corporation, a government-linked company. On 1 January 2020, the local authority was upgraded and renamed Pengerang Municipal Council, and subsequently the authority of Johor Corporation over the municipality was terminated.

The main towns and villages encompassed by the municipality include:

 Bandar Penawar
 Pasir Gogok
 Sungai Rengit
 Tanjung Pengelih
 Teluk Ramunia
 Teluk Sengat

Economy
The Johor State Government has picked Pengerang for a catalyst project for rural transformation program. Johor’s Chief Minister Datuk Mohamed Khaled Nordin said the area has seen steady development over the last few years as investments poured in because of the Pengerang Integrated Petroleum Complex (PIPC). “When Pengerang was chosen as the location for an oil and gas hub it was not only to give a positive impact to the country but to also transform rural areas where the people will reap the rewards of development,” he said at a press conference after presenting 100 agriculture land grants at Taman Bayu Damai, Pengerang on 23 February 2015.

Pengerang is well known for Malaysia's mega project named PIPC which is sited in the area. The project was announced in 2011 and Pengerang was chosen for Malaysia's national project due to its strategic location in the region. The PIPC is one big step in creating value to the downstream oil and gas value chain in Johor and Malaysia. Sited in Pengerang, it is a national mega project located on a single plot measuring of 20,000 acres. Upon completion, the project will house oil refineries, naphtha crackers, petrochemical plants as well as a liquefied natural gas (LNG) import terminals and a regasification plant.

The component of this mammoth project was first initiated with the development of the Pengerang Deepwater Terminal or PDT, a joint-venture between Dialog Group, Royal Vopak of The Netherlands and the State of Johor. Serving as a centralised storage facilities for trading, refining and petrochemical industry, the Deepwater Terminal is envisioned to have a storage capacity of 5 million cubic meters. The USD 3 Billion facility includes an independent terminal for trading, a dedicated industrial terminal for consumption of investors within PIPC and a Liquefied Natural Gas Terminal. The construction of a deepwater jetty facility with natural water depth would enable the berthing of both ultra large crude carriers and very large crude carriers. PDT received its first shipment of oil in the first quarter of 2014 and continues to cater to the growing demand for its services.

The other component of PIPC is the Petronas’ PIPC which is PETRONAS’ largest downstream investment in a single location to date, the development includes the USD 16 billion Refinery and Petrochemical Integrated Development Project or RAPID. This also involves the USD 11 billion associated facilities consisting of Air Separation Unit, Raw Water Supply, Cogeneration Plant, Regasification Terminal, Deepwater Terminal and Utilities and Facilities. Upon its completion in 2019, PIC will have a refining capacity of 300,000 barrels per day with petrochemical plants yielding an estimated production capacity of 3.6 million tonnes per annum of petrochemical products. The development of PIPC which received full support from both state government and federal governments will also benefit the local community by creating more access to economic opportunities other than the provision of public infrastructure and a complete infrastructure in Pengerang, Johor, PIPC also will create a total of 8,600 jobs in the operational phase by year 2020.

Tourist attractions
Pengerang coastal batteries (a fort), located nearby Tanjung Pengelih, are a heritage trail of World War II. The battery was constructed at the mouth of Sungai Santi, overlooking Straits of Johor and was abandoned after the war. The battery is said to be the biggest defence fort outside the United Kingdom. It sits on a 610 hectares plot of land and once had barracks and a hospital. Pengerang battery is a lost fortress located in Johor. Overlooking Straits of Johor, it is located close to a Malaysian military camp, standing on the top of a little hill covered by jungle.

Transportation

The main road is provided by Route 92, from Kota Tinggi to the main settlement of Sungai Rengit. 

Pengerang has two public ferry terminals at Tanjung Belungkor and Tanjung Pengelih. The port at Tanjung Belungkor hosts ferries to Changi Point, Singapore, as well as Sekupang on the island of Batam, Indonesia. The port at Tanjung Pengelih also hosts ferries to Changi Point, as well as Tanah Merah. There is also an exclusive port for customers to the Sebana Cove Resort travelling from HarbourFront and Tanah Merah.

References

External links 
 
 
 Pengerang Municipal Council official website 

Mukims of Kota Tinggi District
Malaysia–Singapore border crossings